Sriramnagar may refer to places in India:
 
Sriramnagar, Ranga Reddy district, Andhra Pradesh
Sriramnagar, Vizianagaram district, Andhra Pradesh